Vladlen Semyonovich Davydov (1924 —  2012) was a  Soviet and Russian theater and film actor. People's Artist of the RSFSR (1969). The winner of two Stalin Prizes (1950, 1951). Member of the Communist Party of the Soviet Union since 1950. Academician of the National Academy of Motion Picture Arts.

Family 
Wife —  Margarita Anastasyeva (born 10 January 1925), Honored Artist of Russia,  Moscow Art Theatre's actress and author  
 Son —  Andrey Davydov (born 2 July 1951), Honored Artist of Russia,  Moscow Art Theatre's actor.

Filmography
1944: Ivan the Terrible as oprichnik
1949: Encounter at the Elbe as Nikita Kuzmin
1950: Cossacks of the Kuban as breeder Nikolai Matveyevich Kovalev
1953: Outpost in the Mountains as Sergey Lunin
1957: The Road to Calvary as decadent poet Alexei Bessonov
1960: Letiste neprijímá as Kulygin
1962: Amphibian Man as Olsen, the reporter
1970: Liberation I: The Fire Bulge as Konstantin Rokossovsky
1970: Liberation II: Breakthrough as Konstantin Rokossovsky
1971: Liberation III: Direction of the Main Blow as Konstantin Rokossovsky
1972: Tobacco Captain (TV Movie) as Peter the Great
1973: Seventeen Moments of Spring (TV Series) as Dulles employee
1977: Soldiers of Freedom (TV Mini-Series) as Konstantin Rokossovsky
1984: TASS Is Authorized to Declare... (TV Movie) as Yeremin, a spokesman for the Foreign Ministry
2000: The Envy of Gods as  Sonia's father
2000: The Will of the Emperor as Dmitry Mikhaylovich Golitsyn
2011: Burnt by the Sun 2: The Citadel as Vsevolod Konstantinovich

Awards 
 Stalin Prize of the first degree (1950)  
 Stalin Prize second degree (1951) 
 State Prize of the Russian Federation (1997) 
 Order of the Badge of Honour (1950)
 Order of Friendship of Peoples (1984)
 Order of Honour (1998) 
 Order For Merit to the Fatherland IV degree (2004) 
 Honored Artist of the RSFSR (1959)
 People's Artist of the RSFSR (1969)

References

External links
 

1924 births
2012 deaths
Soviet male actors
Russian male actors
20th-century Russian male actors
21st-century Russian male actors
Recipients of the Order of Honour (Russia)
Recipients of the Order of Friendship of Peoples
People's Artists of the RSFSR
State Prize of the Russian Federation laureates
Stalin Prize winners
Communist Party of the Soviet Union members
Burials at Vagankovo Cemetery
Male actors from Moscow
Recipients of the Order "For Merit to the Fatherland", 4th class
Moscow Art Theatre School alumni